The 2022 Campeonato da Primeira Divisão de Futebol Profissional da FGF - Divisão Especial - Série A1, better known as the 2022 Campeonato Gaúcho (officially the Gauchão Ipiranga 2022 for sponsorship reasons), was the 102nd season of Rio Grande do Sul's top flight football league. The competition was played from 26 January to 2 April 2022. 12 clubs contested in the Campeonato Gaúcho. Grêmio were the four-time defending champion.

Teams
A total of 12 teams competed in the 2022 Série A1 season.

First stage

Table

Results

Positions by matchday
The table lists the positions of teams after each matchday.

Knockout stage

Semi-finals
The first legs were played on 19–20 March, and the second legs were played on 23 March 2022.

|}

Match C1

Ypiranga advances to the finals.

Match C2

Grêmio advances to the finals.

Finals
The first legs will be played on 26 March, and the second legs will be played on 2 April 2022.

|}

Match G1

First leg

Second leg

Overall table

Statistics

Top scorers

References

Campeonato Gaúcho seasons
Gaúcho
2022 in Brazilian football